Himmatvar  is a 1996 Bollywood film directed by Talat Jani, starring Dharmendra, Hitesh and Rubaina Khan.

Cast
 Dharmendra... Sultan
 Rubaina Khan... Anjali
 Hitesh... Jai
 Mukesh Khanna... Inspector Rajeshwar
 Gajendra Chouhan... Inspector Patil
 Bharat Kapoor... Inspector Shrikant
 Mohan Joshi... Damodar / DK

Soundtrack
The songs were written by Sameer, Anwar Sagar and Nadeem, and were composed by Nadeem-Shravan.

References

External links
 

1996 films
1990s Hindi-language films
Films scored by Nadeem–Shravan
Films directed by Talat Jani